Hugosson is a surname. Notable people with the surname include:

Doris Hugosson (born 1963), Swedish cross-country skier
Mattias Hugosson (born 1974), Swedish footballer

Swedish-language surnames